Triglyphus primus is a species of hoverfly, from the family Syrphidae, in the order Diptera. The larvae seem to be host-specific to an aphid species Cryptosiphum artemisiae which creates galls on Mugwort Artemisia vulgaris.

References

Diptera of Europe
Pipizinae
Insects described in 1840
Taxa named by Hermann Loew